The Long Beach Stingrays was a women's professional basketball team.  It existed for only the 1997–98 season, and was a member of the American Basketball League (ABL).

The Stingrays played most of their home games at the Walter Pyramid on the campus of California State University, Long Beach; however, one home game was played at the Arrowhead Pond of Anaheim (now the Honda Center). Their head coach was Maura McHugh.

The Stingrays' biggest star player was their center, Yolanda Griffith. Other notable Stingrays included Beverly Williams, Michelle M. Marciniak, and the former Olympic athlete Venus Lacy.

In what turned out to be the team's only season, the Stingrays made it all the way to the ABL's championship round. They beat the defending champion Columbus Quest in the first two games (both in Long Beach) but lost the final three games in Columbus, and with that, the series.

Despite their strong first season, the Stingrays were viewed largely with indifference by area fans. They had the league's worst attendance; for most of the season, they attracted crowds in the hundreds. Citing anemic season ticket sales and weak corporate sponsorship, league officials shuttered the Stingrays in August 1998. The rest of the league followed in December.

Griffith, like most of the ABL's star players, eventually joined the competing Women's National Basketball Association (WNBA) Griffith went on to a long career in the WNBA, most notably for the Sacramento Monarchs. As for McHugh, she has coached various professional and college teams.

Team record

Regular season

Post-season
ABL Playoffs First-Round

ABL SemifinalsABL Championship Series

League honorsYolanda Griffith'''
 ABL Defensive Player of the Year, 1997–98
 All-ABL First Team, 1997–98

References
  Article headline, author, date, and lead paragraph, in reverse chronological order, each linked to page of the article.

American Basketball League (1996–1998) teams
Defunct basketball teams in the United States
Basketball teams established in 1997
Basketball teams disestablished in 1998
Sports in Long Beach, California
Women's sports in California

ca:American Basketball League III